Ajaylat ( al ʿajaylat) is the name of a region and small city located in the Nuqat al Khams district of Libya. It is located roughly 80 kilometers west of Tripoli. From 1983 to 1988, the region was a district of Libya with the city as its capital.

Tribal groups
The regional tribal groups (qabā’il) are currently subdivided into two primary tribal federations or sections.

The second tribal federation is known as the (2) Aulād Rāshid'اولاد راشد', which consists of; Aulād Al-Sheikh; and Aulād Rāshid. Aulad Al-Shikh (اولاد الشيخ) which consists of Aulad Mousa (اولاد موسى)  Aulad Bozed (اولاد ابوزيد) Al-Mashara (المشارة), and Al-Draba (الدرباء).

The total population in the minţaqa'' (area) Al-A’jēlāt is estimated at about 100,000 individuals scattered among those tribes.

Economy
The Ajaylat region is most famous for the cultivation of palm trees, olives and various types of vegetables. There is also a medical center.

Libyan civil war
On 14 August 2011, anti-Gaddafi forces fighting in the Libyan Civil War claimed they had taken Ajaylat.

Notes

Ajaylat
Baladiyat of Libya